Bradley Allan Kasal (born May 1, 1966) is a United States Marine who received the Navy Cross for heroic actions performed as the first sergeant of Weapons Company, 3rd Battalion, 1st Marines during a firefight in Operation Phantom Fury in Fallujah, Iraq on November 13, 2004. He received the decoration in May 2006 during a ceremony at Camp Pendleton, followed by his promotion to sergeant major and reenlistment in the U.S. Marine Corps. He retired in 2018 after nearly thirty-four years of service.

Career

Iraq War

Actions in Iraq
In a firefight with insurgents in a house in Fallujah, although wounded by seven 7.62×39mm rounds in the legs and hit by more than 43 pieces of hot fragmentation from a grenade while using his body to shield an injured fellow Marine, PFC Alex Nicoll (who was also injured in the legs), First Sergeant Kasal refused to quit fighting and was able to return fire with a handgun, killing at least one insurgent. Kasal is credited with saving the lives of several Marines during the U.S. assault on insurgent strongholds in Fallujah in November 2004.

By the time he was carried out of the house by LCpl Chris Marquez and LCpl Dane Shaffer, then-First Sergeant Kasal had lost approximately 60 percent of his blood. The photograph of Kasal, taken by photographer Lucian Read — blood-soaked and still holding his M9 pistol and KA-Bar fighting knife — being helped from the building by fellow Marines, has become one of the iconic pictures of the war.

Recovery
Due to the injuries, Kasal lost four inches of bone in his right leg. He has undergone 21 surgeries to date in order to repair his injuries and save his leg. Kasal continues his recovery from his wounds and still walks with a limp.

Kasal served as the Sergeant Major of Recruiting Station Des Moines, Iowa from May 2006 until January 2010. He then returned to Camp Pendleton to serve as the Sergeant Major at the School of Infantry West In March 2010, Kasal was featured in the debut episode of Sharing the Courage, a graphic novel series depicting decorated Marines of the 21st century. On November 15, 2012, the book My Men are My Heroes: The Brad Kasal Story by Nathaniel Helms, was released; published by the Navel Institute Press. He became sergeant major of the Fourth Marine Division in March 2013 and then became sergeant major of the First Marine Expeditionary Force in February 2015.

After retirement 
Kasal retired in 2018, after 34 years with the United States Marine Corps. From the USMC, Kasal started work at high schools to teach at the MCJROTC program. He continued to teach about discipline, honour, respect, & courage through his experiences in the Marine Corps.

Navy Cross citation
The President of the United States Takes Pleasure in Presenting The Navy Cross To

Bradley A. Kasal
First Sergeant, United States Marine Corps
For Services as Set Forth in the Following Citation:

Notes

References

Gonzalez, Cindy. (February 13, 2005) Omaha World-Herald.
Helms, Nathaniel R. (February 2, 2005) "From an Iowa Town to a Marine Corps Legend". DefenseWatch. (URL accessed May 3, 2006)
Perry, Tony. (May 1, 2006). "Marine Hero to Be Decorated for His Bravery", Los Angeles Times.  (URL accessed May 6, 2006)
Shapiro, Joseph. (March 8, 2005) "Caring for the Wounded: The Story of Two Marines." NPR Morning Edition.  (URL accessed May 3, 2006)

External links

1966 births
United States Marine Corps personnel of the Gulf War
United States Marine Corps personnel of the Iraq War
Living people
People from Marengo, Iowa
Recipients of the Legion of Merit
Recipients of the Navy Cross (United States)
United States Marines